Meet Me at the Fountain is a 1904 American silent short comedy film written, produced, and directed by Siegmund Lubin. Actors in the movie included Gilbert Sarony, a well-known cross-dressing performer. The film was inspired by Wallace McCutcheon's 1904 film Personal.

Plot

The film starts with a title reading 'A remake of "Personal" in which a man advertises in the newspaper for a wife, asking interested parties to "meet me at the fountain"'. It is followed by a middle close-up of the man drafting the advertisement, a middle shot of the man posting it, and again a middle close-up of the man getting ready in front of a mirror. This is followed by a full shot of the man waiting at the meeting point in front of a fountain. First comes a nanny, pushing a baby stroller. He bows low and wants to kiss the baby but she pushes him away. 

A number of women arrive, he begins to greet them but when they become too insistent, he runs away, chased by the group of women. He catches a streetcar, jumps over a fence, runs up a flight of stairs, climbs up a tree, then a wall but they keep following him. He finally falls into a river where one of the ladies follows him and helps him get out of the water, she is the winner.

The film ends with a medium close-up of the bride and bridegroom all dressed up, which reveals that the bride is actually a man dressed as a woman. The two men French kiss.

Production and analysis

This is the third film shot in the United States in 1904 showing a man placing an advertisement in order to get married and ending up being chased by a group of women. The first was Personal, directed by Wallace McCutcheon Sr., for the Biograph Company and the second How a French Nobleman Got a Wife through the New York Herald ‘Personal’ Column directed by Edwin S. Porter for the Edison Manufacturing Company. 

Siegmund Lubin, who was trained as an optometrist and had built his own camera and projector combination started in 1896 distributing films notably from Thomas Edison in Philadelphia. From 1897 he started making films and in 1902 formed the Lubin Manufacturing Company. This film is mostly composed of outdoors wide shots and includes at the beginning and at the end medium close-ups shot indoors.

While the film is presented as a remake of Personal, it includes a greater variety of shots and more importantly presents an unprecedented twist at the end with the shot revealing that the bride is a man, which makes it the first transgender film.

References

External links
 
Meet me at the Fountain at A Cinema History

1904 films
1904 comedy films
American silent short films
American black-and-white films
Films shot in Pennsylvania
Surviving American silent films
1900s American films